The men's bantamweight (54 kilograms) event at the 2006 Asian Games took place from 2 to 13 December 2006 at Aspire Hall 5, Doha, Qatar.

Schedule
All times are Arabia Standard Time (UTC+03:00)

Results 
Legend
RSCO — Won by referee stop contest outscored

Final

Top half

Bottom half

References

External links
Official website

54